Jarrod Brian Stockley Smith (born 20 July 1984) is a New Zealand professional footballer who currently plays for Team Wellington.

Career

College
Smith moved to the United States after he was recruited by and played three seasons for former West Virginia University head coach Michael Seabolt and played for the Mountaineers in the 2005 and 2006 NCAA Men's Soccer Championship tournaments. He played as a striker and as a winger for WVU.  In four seasons with the Mountaineers, Smith scored 32 goals in 74 matches.  As a senior in 2006, he scored a career high 14 goals in only 16 matches under first-year coach Marlon LeBlanc.

Professional
On 18 January 2007, Smith was selected by Toronto FC with the first pick in the 2007 MLS Supplemental Draft, but signed for Crystal Palace Baltimore in August 2007.  In March 2008 the player was included on Toronto FC's website as an active member of the roster. He made MLS debut for Toronto playing against Los Angeles Galaxy on 13 April 2008, and scored his team's second goal en route to a 3–2 victory.

On 26 November of that year, Smith was selected by Seattle Sounders FC in the fourth round of the 2008 MLS Expansion Draft. On 1 July, Smith made his debut with the Sounders in a U.S. Open Cup match against USL side Portland Timbers. On 17 July, he was released without making a league appearance for the club. Smith joined Hawke's Bay United for 2010-2011 ASB Premiership season.

Smith signed with Swedish Superettan club Ljungskile SK at the beginning of the 2011 season, but due to injury only made one league appearance for the club. He scored his only goals in Sweden in a Svenska Cupen game against Torslanda IK on 20 April 2011, where he scored two goals. Smith was released at the end of the season.

International
Smith played on New Zealand's Under-20 and under-23 teams, and was part of the New Zealand U-23 side narrowly beaten to Oceania's spot at 2004 Athens Olympics by Australia.

Jarrod Smith made his debut for the New Zealand national team (All Whites) against Malaysia, on 23 February 2006. He was also a member of New Zealand's 2006 summer tour of Europe.  He came off the bench in games against Hungary and Georgia, before starting against Estonia. In the final game, against Brazil, Smith entered the game as a substitute in the 60th minute. Smith was included in the 2009 FIFA Confederations Cup. As of December 2011 Smith had made 12 appearances in official full internationals without scoring.

Statistics

Personal
Born in Havelock North, Smith is the son of former New Zealand cricketer and broadcast commentator Ian Smith and his wife Louise Smith. He attended West Virginia University with a major in sports management.

References

External links

 West Virginia Mountaineers athletics profile
 
 Moving up the Mountain
 2007/2008 season stats - NZFC
 

Living people
1984 births
New Zealand association footballers
West Virginia Mountaineers men's soccer players
Colorado Rapids U-23 players
Crystal Palace Baltimore players
New Zealand international footballers
Hawke's Bay United FC players
Toronto FC players
Seattle Sounders FC players
Ljungskile SK players
Team Wellington players
People from Havelock North
New Zealand expatriate association footballers
People educated at Palmerston North Boys' High School
USL League Two players
Major League Soccer players
Superettan players
Toronto FC draft picks
Association football forwards
2008 OFC Nations Cup players
2009 FIFA Confederations Cup players
Expatriate soccer players in the United States
Expatriate soccer players in Canada
Expatriate footballers in Sweden
New Zealand expatriate sportspeople in the United States
New Zealand expatriate sportspeople in Canada
New Zealand expatriate sportspeople in Sweden
Sportspeople from the Hawke's Bay Region